The Ann and Robert H. Lurie Biomedical Engineering Building officially opened in August 2006. It was part of an expansion of the University of Michigan Biomedical Engineering Department (BME). The building houses researchers previously spread through several different University of Michigan campus locations.

Programs in the facility emphasize cellular and molecular biotechnologies. The addition contains research laboratory and support space. The renovation provides wet and dry teaching labs, classrooms, a computer classroom, support spaces, conference rooms, meeting rooms, faculty offices, a kitchen, and clerical support spaces.

References
  The University Record Article on the Lurie Building
  Biomedical Engineering at the University of Michigan

University of Michigan campus
2006 establishments in Michigan